The Secretary of State for War, later Secretary of State, Minister for War, was one of the four or five specialized secretaries of state in France during the Ancien Régime. The position was responsible for the Army, for the Marshalcy and for overseeing French border provinces. In 1791, during the French Revolution, the Secretary of State for War became titled Minister of War.

List of secretaries

Notes

References

See also 
 Ancien Régime in France
 Early Modern France

 War